The 2015 Monaco ePrix was a Formula E motor race held on 9 May 2015 on the Circuit de Monaco, a street circuit in Monte Carlo, Monaco. It was the seventh championship race of the single-seater, electrically powered racing car series' inaugural season. The race was won by Sébastien Buemi, who became the first multiple race winner in the series.

Report

Background
For the second race in a row, the driver lineup was exactly the same as for the previous race. Fanboost was awarded to Nelson Piquet Jr., Jean-Éric Vergne and Salvador Durán.

Classification

Qualifying

Race

Notes:
 – Three points for pole position.
 – Scott Speed received a drive through penalty converted into a 33-second time penalty for exceeding maximum power usage.
 – Two points for fastest lap.

Standings after the race

Drivers' Championship standings

Teams' Championship standings

 Notes: Only the top five positions are included for both sets of standings.

References

External links
 Official results

|- style="text-align:center"
|width="35%"|Previous race:2015 Long Beach ePrix
|width="30%"|FIA Formula E Championship2014–15 season
|width="35%"|Next race:2015 Berlin ePrix
|- style="text-align:center"
|width="35%"|Previous race:N/A
|width="30%"|Monaco ePrix
|width="35%"|Next race:2017 Monaco ePrix
|- style="text-align:center"

Monaco ePrix
ePrix
Monaco ePrix